The GCC Champions League, is an annually organized football league tournament for club of the Arabian Peninsula.

The 2006 edition was the 22nd time that it was organised and was won by Sauid side Al-Ettifaq for the third time.

The Groups

Results

Group A
(in Manama, Bahrain)

Group B
(in Salala, Oman)

Group C
(in Riyadh, Saudi Arabia)

Semi-finals

1st Legs

2nd Legs

Final

Winner

 
 

GCC Champions League
Gulf Club Champions Cup, 2006